The Treaty of Nymphenburg was a treaty between Bavaria and Spain that was concluded on May 28, 1741 at the Nymphenburg Palace in Munich. It was the first formal pact of a series of French-sponsored alliances against the Habsburg Monarch, Maria Theresa. Through the agreement, the Bavarian Elector Charles Albert gained the support of King Philip V of Spain to become the next Holy Roman Emperor against the claims of the Habsburgs. The treaty was brokered by Marshal Belleisle under the authority of Louis XV of France. As part of the negotiations, the French agreed to materially support Charles Albert's claims.  The treaty signaled the expansion of the First Silesian War, which started as a local war between Prussia and the Habsburg Monarchy, into the War of the Austrian Succession, a pan-European conflict.

Background
The major event leading up to this treaty was the death of the Habsburg Monarch and Holy Roman Emperor, Charles VI in October, 1740. Charles VI died without a son, so the succession fell to his daughter Maria Theresa. The Habsburg Monarchy had been subject to Salic law which excluded women from inheriting the Habsburg throne, but the 1713 Pragmatic Sanction, which the majority of major European courts agreed to, allowed a daughter of the emperor to succeed to the throne. Based on the Pragmatic Sanction, Maria Theresa assumed the throne.

In December 1740, Frederick II used the death of Charles VI and the uncertain status of Maria Theresa as an opportunity to invade and acquire the Habsburg Monarchy's province of Silesia for Prussia. This started the First Silesian War between Frederick II of Prussia and Maria Theresa of the Habsburg Monarchy. On 10 April 1741, the Prussian army defeated the Habsburg forces at the Battle of Mollwitz, which allowed Frederick to maintain his hold on Silesia and showed the military weakness of Maria Theresa's armies. This in turn, encouraged other courts to take advantage of the Habsburg Monarchy's apparent vulnerability to expand their own territories at the Habsburg's expense.

Negotiations
Within two months of Frederick's victory at Mollwitz,  Marshal Belleisle, who served under the authority of Louis XV of France, began a circuit of the courts of the Holy Roman Empire to find allies in a war against the Habsburg Monarchy. In May 1741, Bellisle went to Munich to negotiate with the Bavarian Elector Charles Albert, who wished to be crowned as the Holy Roman Emperor rather than an Austrian Habsburg heir. When Bellisle arrived, Charles Albert was already meeting with representatives of King Philip V of Spain regarding a military alliance against the Habsburg Monarchy, as  Philip was looking for an opportunity to create a duchy for his son Don Philip from the Habsburg Monarchy's Italian territories. Bellisle quickly brought negotiations between Bavaria, Spain and France to a successful conclusion. He brokered a treaty between the Bavaria and Spain, which was signed on May 28, 1741 at the Nymphenburg Palace. In this treaty, Spain supported the claim of Charles Albert to become the next Holy Roman Emperor. In addition, Bellisle also committed France to an alliance with Bavaria, providing both financial and military support for Charles Albert's claim. Charles Albert later affirmed his personal commitment to these agreements by stating: "I will never separate myself from my friends and never conclude peace without their knowledge and approval". Although the French subsequently provided money and soldiers to support Charles Albert against the Habsburg Monarchy, there is still no reliable evidence that a formal written treaty between France and Bavaria existed.

League of Nymphenburg
After the negotiations in Nymphenburg, Marshal Belleisle continued to expand the alliance against the Habsburg monarchy by recruiting other Central European courts. France signed a treaty with Frederick II of Prussia in June 1741, and another with Frederick Augustus II of Saxony in the following September. Charles Emmanuel III of Savoy-Sardinia also joined the alliance. This anti-Habsburg alliance of France, Spain, Bavaria, Prussia, Saxony and Savoy-Sardinia became known as the League of Nymphenburg. For their role in the alliance, each of the participants were promised portions of the Habsburg lands.  This coalition effectively negated the Pragmatic Sanction through its agreement to carve up much of the Habsburg lands amongst themselves.  As a result, the First Silesian War broadened into a continent-wide conflict, the War of Austrian Succession, as Maria Theresa defended the Habsburg monarchy against the array of European courts making up the League.

References

Citations

Works cited
 
   
 
 
 
 
  
 
   
  
   
   
  

 
 
 
  
  
   
   
  
  
  

1741 treaties
1741 in the Holy Roman Empire
Treaties of Bavaria
Treaties of Spain
Treaties of the Silesian Wars
18th-century military alliances
Military alliances involving Bavaria
Military alliances involving Spain
Charles VII, Holy Roman Emperor